"Dancing Daze" is a song written by Sharon O'Neill and performed by Wendy Matthews and Jenny Morris. It was released in January 1986 as the lead single and main theme to the 1986 ABC television miniseries of the same name.

At the ARIA Music Awards of 1987, Wendy Matthews was nominated for ARIA Award for Best Female Artist.

Track listings

References

1986 singles
Wendy Matthews songs
Jenny Morris (musician) songs
Songs written by Sharon O'Neill
1985 songs